Kate Craig (September 15, 1947 – July 23, 2002) was a Canadian video and performance artist.  She was a founding member of the artist-run centre the Western Front, where she supported the video and performance works of many artists while producing her own body of work. She is known for her performances such as "Lady Brute," and for her video works.

Biography
Catherine Shand Craig was born on September 15, 1947, in Victoria, British Columbia.  She was the third child of Sidney Osborne Craig (née Scott) and Charles Edward Craig.  Her parents divorced in 1956.  In 1960, her mother married Douglas Shadbolt, an architect and brother of the painter Jack Shadbolt.  The family moved to Montreal and then to Halifax, Nova Scotia, where Craig attended Dalhousie University (1961).

Craig met artist Eric Metcalfe in Victoria and they married in 1969. They moved to Vancouver, where, along with friends and fellow artists Michael Morris, Vincent Trasov and Glenn Lewis, they bought the space that became the Western Front in the Mount Pleasant area of Vancouver.

Craig and Metcalfe separated in 1973, but continued to work together on collaborative projects. That year, Craig met artist Hank Bull. As a couple they worked on projects with Metcalfe, Lewis, Patrick Ready, Margaret Dragu and many others. Craig established and curated the Western Front's Artist-in Residence video program from 1977 to 1993.

In 1980 and 1981 Craig and Bull traveled through Indonesia, India, Africa, and Europe, performing Around The World in Over 365 Days. Craig married Bull in 1990.

After retiring from her position as Curator of Media Arts at the Western Front in 1993, she spent the late 1990s preparing for a major retrospective of her work at the Vancouver Art Gallery, entitled Skin. Craig's "idea of performance was always informed by community and based on thinking life is an art project", even at end of her life. She died of cancer in Storm Bay, British Columbia, in 2002.

Performance art

Lady Brute 

Eric Metcalfe was a fine arts student at the University of Victoria and Craig was drawn to his circle of artists and performers. In 1969, he created a mail art persona called "Dr. Brute", and Craig became "Lady Brute". This collaborative project created the fictional world of "Brutopia." Their collection of leopard material filled this world and the characters examined the foibles of western society. In 1972, Lady Brute appeared as the "Picture of the Week" in an issue of FILE magazine and marched in the Victoria Day parade in Victoria, B.C. Her performances were usually informal, happening in the real world rather than on stage. She would attend an opening or a dinner in her leopard regalia and that was the performance. In 1974 she performed "Flying Leopard" in Vancouver at Cates Park, and again on Hornby Island.  In 1975 she produced her first video, "Skins: Lady Brute presents her Leopardskin Wardrobe".  In that same year she and Metcalfe curated the exhibition "Spots Before Your Eyes" at the Western Front and A Space.  Lady Brute continued to make appearances and participate in exhibitions through the 1970s.

1974 – Dr. and Lady Brute attended Hollywood Decadence and Art’s Birthday, Elk's Lodge, Los Angeles, performing with the Brute Saxes.
1975 – A guest appearance with the Hummer Sisters in Toronto
1975 – Ace Space Show at the Western Front
1976 – Dr. and Lady Brute, an evening of film video, slides and performance at the Art Gallery of Greater Victoria

Performance groups 

In 1974, Craig was a founding member of the "ettes", a women's "post feminist" performance group. They performed as the "Peanettes" during Mr. Peanut's campaign for mayor of Vancouver. They also performed as the Coconettes and the Vignettes in 1975.  She was a founder of the Lux Radio Players in 1974, a group involved in the collaborative writing and production of radio plays performed for live audiences and broadcast throughout North America over community radio stations until 1977. She was also a founding member of The Canadian Shadow Players in 1976, performing nationally and internationally until 1986.

Lux Radio Players 

1974 – A Clear Cut Case at Western Front
1975 – A Bite Tonight, Planet of the Whales (for the sendoff party, first Green Peace Anti-Whaling expedition); and The Raw and the Plucked by Mary Beth Knechtel
1976 – Habitart, or How to Live with Your Just Desserts, commissioned by the Vancouver Art Gallery for the Habitat Festival
1976 – The Thief of Gladbag, commissioned and performed for the Judy Lamarsh Show on CBC Radio, at the Hotel Vancouver
1977 – Weather or Naught at the Western Front

Peanettes 

1974 – performance with the Mr. Peanut's mayoral campaign

Vignettes 

1975 – Amy Vanderbilt Valentine Debutante's Ball at the Western Front

Coconettes 

1975 – Ace Space Show with Lady Brute at the Western Front

Canadian Shadow Players 

1976 – The Exploits and Opinions of Dr. Faustroll, a commission by the City of Vancouver for the Habitat Festival, the production tours
1977 – The Exploits and Opinions of Dr. Faustroll at the Art Gallery of Greater Victoria
1978 – Vis-à-vis, a commission by The Music Gallery, Toronto, touring to Montreal, Ottawa, Hamilton, Vancouver and Victoria
1982 – Aka Nada, a commission by The Music Gallery, Toronto, touring to Montreal, Ottawa, Berlin, Santa Barbara, Innsbruck, and Lienz, Austria
1985 – Corpus Collossum, funded by the Department of External Affairs and the Holland Festival
1986 – The Pataphysics of Umbrology at the Centre for Creative Music,  Mills College, Oakland, California

Performances 
1973 – German T.V. Dinner, a performance by Western Front for German TV Network, film directed by Dr. W. von Bonin 
1974 – Flying Leopard in Vancouver at Cates Park and on Hornby Island
1975 – Appeared as a Supreme Court judge in Errol’s Errors, Byron Black
1976 – 1980 – Guest spots on the HP dinner show, CFRO-FM, Vancouver
1976 – Presented solo evening of video, film and slides, Langton Street Gallery, San Francisco 
1977 – Played drums for The Young Adults, a Vancouver-based punk band
1979 – A video of Flying Leopard on view at Video Inn during the Living Art Performance Festival, Vancouver
1979 – Performed At the End of the World, in collaboration with Hank Bull at the Robson Media Center, Vancouver
1980 – Appeared as a frumpy desk clerk in Colin Campbell's Peachland
1981 – Performed La Chaise des Memes, a shadow play in collaboration with Hank Bull
1982 – Appeared making a mandala in Ko Nakajima’s video Mandala 82
1984 – Appeared as herself in Marshalore’s video installation Album
1984 – Appeared as a flute player in Fraser Finlayson’s Come Fly with Sunny Day
1985 – Appeared as one of the respirating in Margaret Dragu’s video Breath

Photographic works 

 1977 – Flying Leopard, photo-serigraph on paper 18/24, Collection of the Burnaby Art Gallery

Solo exhibitions 
 January 31 – May 3, 1998, Skin, Vancouver Art Gallery
 September 21 – October 20, 2002, Kate Craig, Charles H Scott Gallery

Group exhibitions 
 February 14, 1989 – May 21, 1989: Rebel Girls: A Survey of Canadian Feminist Videotapes 1974-1988, National Gallery of Canada  
 October 28 – November 1, 1998: Pinholes in Paradise: A Fundraiser for Presentation House Gallery
 January 24, 2000: Recollect, art from the permanent collection at the Vancouver Art Gallery

The Western Front 

In 1973 Kate Craig and seven other artists (Martin Bartlett, Mo van Nostrand, Henry Greenhow, Glenn Lewis, Eric Metcalfe, Michael Morris, and Vincent Trasov) purchased the former Knights of Pythias lodge hall and founded the Western Front Society.  An artist-run centre, The Western Front became a centre for artistic exploration in many disciplines.

Craig established and curated an Artist-in-Residence video program in 1977. In addition to creating her own work, she fostered and produced video works with an impressive array of Canadian and international artists, including Stan Douglas, Mona Hatoum, Tony Oursler and Robert Filliou. In 1993 she retired from her position as curator of media arts.

The Western Front continues to support exhibitions, concerts, workshops, performances and maintains an extensive media archive.

Video works 

1975 – "Skins:  Lady Brute Presents her Leopardskin Wardrobe" (b/w, 60 min.)
1976 – "Still Life:  A Moving Portrait" (colour, 30 min.)
1978 – "Backup" in collaboration with Margaret Dragu (colour, 36 min.)
1979 – "Delicate Issue" (colour, 12 min.)
1979 – "Clay Cove, Newfoundland" (b/w, 20 min.) 
1980 – "Straight Jacket"
1983 – "Canada Shadow" in collaboration with Hank Bull 
1986 – "Ma"
1989 – "Mary Lou"

See also 
Storm Bay (British Columbia)

Further reading 
Art & Correspondence from the Western Front (Vancouver: Western Front, 1979) 
The F Word (Vancouver: Western Front, 2009) 
Golden Streams (Mississauga: Blackwood Gallery, 2003) 
Kate Craig: Skin (Vancouver: Vancouver Art Gallery, 1998) 
Luminous Sites: 10 Video Installations (Vancouver: Video Inn / Western Front, 1986)
Rebel Girls: A Survey of Canadian Feminist Videotapes, 1974-1988 (Ottawa: National Gallery of Canada, 1989) 
Shifts and Transfers: On Some Tendencies in Canadian Video (Ottawa: Ottawa Art Gallery, 2003) 
Under Scrutiny: Video at the Western Front (Vancouver: Western Front, 2003) 
Vancouver: Art and Artists 1931–1983 (Vancouver: Vancouver Art Gallery, 1983)

References

External links 
Western Front, Kate Craig
Eric Metcalf Fonds - Memory BC

1947 births
2002 deaths
Artists from Victoria, British Columbia
Canadian performance artists
Women performance artists
Canadian video artists
Women video artists
20th-century Canadian women artists